In Riemannian geometry, the smooth coarea formulas relate integrals over the domain of certain mappings with integrals over their codomains.

Let  be smooth Riemannian manifolds of respective dimensions . Let  a measurable function. Then, the following two equalities hold:

References
Chavel, Isaac (2006) Riemannian Geometry. A Modern Introduction. Second Edition.

Riemannian geometry